Indigenous peoples of Arizona are the Native American people of the state of Arizona. These include people that have lived in the region since time immemorial; tribes who entered the region centuries ago, such as the Southern Athabascan peoples; and the Pascua Yaqui who settled Arizona in mass in the early 20th century, though small communities had been in the region for hundreds of years prior. 

Arizona has the third largest Native American population of any U.S. state.

Almost a quarter of Arizona is reservation land. The Navajo Nation has the largest reservation in the United States, and the Tohono O'odham Nation in southeast Arizona has the second-largest reservation.

There are 17 federally recognized tribes completely within the borders of Arizona, and 5 more in Arizona whose territory spans multiple states. Of these, 20 tribes are members of the Inter-Tribal Council of Arizona (ITCA).

Native American tribes in Arizona today 
 [[File:Sacaton-Marker-Gila River Indian Reservation-2.jpg|200px|thumb|Historic Marker which reads: <small>'Gila River Indian Reservation (established 1859) Here the first Indian school was established by the government for the Pimas and Maricopas</small>.]]

 Ak Chin Indian Community of the Maricopa (Ak Chin) Indian Reservation, Arizona
 Cocopah Tribe of Arizona
 Fort McDowell Yavapai Nation, Arizona(formerly the Fort McDowell Mohave-Apache Community of the Fort McDowell Indian Reservation)
 Gila River Indian Community of the Gila River Indian Reservation, Arizona
 Havasupai Tribe of the Havasupai Reservation, Arizona
 Hopi Tribe of Arizona
 Hualapai Indian Tribe of the Hualapai Indian Reservation, Arizona
 Kaibab Band of Paiute Indians of the Kaibab Indian Reservation, Arizona
 Pascua Yaqui Tribe of Arizona
 Salt River Pima-Maricopa Indian Community of the Salt River Reservation, Arizona
 San Carlos Apache Tribe of the San Carlos Reservation, Arizona
 San Juan Southern Paiute Tribe of Arizona
 Tohono O'odham Nation of Arizona(formerly Papago Indian Tribe'')
 Tonto Apache Tribe of Arizona
 White Mountain Apache Tribe of the Fort Apache Reservation, Arizona
 Yavapai-Apache Nation of the Camp Verde Indian Reservation, Arizona
 Yavapai-Prescott Tribe of the Yavapai Reservation, Arizona

Multiple states:
 Colorado River Indian Tribes of the Colorado River Indian Reservation, Arizona and California (These include Chemehuevi, Mojave, Hopi, and Navajo people)
 Fort Mojave Indian Tribe of Arizona, California & Nevada
 Navajo Nation, Arizona, New Mexico & Utah
 Quechan Tribe of the Fort Yuma Indian Reservation, California & Arizona
 Zuni Tribe of the Zuni Reservation, New Mexico

Indigenous ethnic groups who lived in Arizona 
Several of the Colorado River tribes are headquartered across the state line in California but have historical connections to Arizona. These include the Chemehuevi, Cocopah (Xawitt Kwñchawaay), Quechan (Yuma), and Mojave (Hamakhava). Many of these are Yuman-speaking peoples.

Yuman language-speaking peoples connected to Arizona include the Havasupai (Havasuw `Baaja), Walapai, Yavapai, Mojave, Hualapai (Hwal `Baaja), Halchidhoma (Xalychidom), Quechan, Maricopa (Piipaash), and Cocopah.

Colorado River Numic language–speakers connected to Arizona include the Southern Paiute, Southern Ute and Chemehuevi.

The Navajo (Diné) and Apache are Southern Athabascan-speaking people who migrated into the American Southwest from the north, possibly around 1300 CE. Apache bands connected to Arizona include the Dilzhe'e Apache, Chiricahua, San Carlos Apache (Nné, Coyotero, or Western Apache), White Mountain Apache

Oʼodham language–speakers include the Akimel O'odham (formerly Pima), Tohono O'odham, and Hia C-eḍ Oʼodham.

Pueblo peoples living in Arizona include the Hopi, Tewa, and Zuni (A:shiwi).

The Yaqui people speak a Uto-Aztecan language.

Precontact cultures of Arizona 

 Ancestral Pueblo peoples, Four Corners area
 Hohokam (Ho:-ho:gam), as far north as the Valley of the Sun and as far south as Mexico.
 Mogollon, southeast Arizona, New Mexico, Sonora, Chihuahua, west Texas
 Patayan, far western Arizona, California
 Sinagua, area around present-day Flagstaff

See also 

 List of Indian reservations in Arizona
 Indigenous languages of Arizona

References

External links
 U.S. Department of the Interior
 Bureau of Indian Affairs
 Tribal Leaders Directory Spring/Summer 2005
 Native Americans in Arizona – timeline, map, cultures
 Ak Chin Indian Community of the Maricopa (Ak Chin) Indian Reservation
 Cocopah Tribe of Arizona
 Colorado River Indian Tribes of the Colorado River Indian Reservation, Arizona and California
 Fort McDowell Yavapai Nation
 Fort Mojave Indian Tribe of Arizona, California & Nevada
 Gila River Indian Community
 Havasupai Tribe of the Havasupai Reservation
 Hopi Tribe of Arizona
 Hualapai Indian Tribe of the Hualapai Indian Reservation
 Kaibab Band of Paiute Indians of the Kaibab Indian Reservation
 Navajo Nation, Arizona, New Mexico & Utah
 Pascua Yaqui, Arizona, Mexico
 Quechan Tribe of the Fort Yuma Indian Reservation, California & Arizona
 Salt River Pima–Maricopa Indian Community of the Salt River Reservation
 San Carlos Apache Tribe of the San Carlos Reservation
 San Juan Southern Paiute Tribe of Arizona
 Tohono O'odham Nation of Arizona
 Tonto Apache Tribe of Arizona
 White Mountain Apache Tribe of the Fort Apache Reservation
 Yavapai–Apache Nation of the Camp Verde Indian Reservation
 Yavapai–Prescott Tribe of the Yavapai Reservation